Oswald Partington, 2nd Baron Doverdale (4 May 1872 – 23 March 1935) was a Liberal Party politician in the United Kingdom.

Career
The second but oldest surviving son of mill-owner Edward Partington (who became the 1st Baron Doverdale), Oswald Partington was born in Bury. Educated at Rossall School, he held a commission in the 4th (Militia) Battalion of the Cheshire Regiment. He was a justice of the peace for the counties of Cheshire and Worcestershire, and a Deputy Lieutenant of the latter county.

Partington entered the family business which involved the production and processing of wood pulp for the manufacture of paper. He became a member of the firm of Olive and Partington, with paper mills in Glossop, Derbyshire and a director of the Kellner-Partington Paper Pulp Company.

He was elected at the 1900 general election as Member of Parliament for High Peak constituency in Derbyshire, and held the seat through two further elections before his defeat at the December 1910 general election.

In March 1913 he was appointed an alderman on London County Council as a member of the Liberal-backed Progressive Party. He remained a member of the council until 1920.

He returned to the House of Commons in 1915 at an uncontested by-election for the Shipley constituency in the West Riding of Yorkshire. The vacancy occurred during the First World War, when the sitting MP, Percy Illingworth, died. Under an agreement between the parties vacant seats were to be uncontested for the duration of the conflict, with only a candidate of the party holding the seat being nominated. Partington stood down at the next general election in 1918.
He succeeded his father in the peerage upon his death in 1925. He died at his London home, Bolney House in Ennismore Gardens, Westminster in 1935 aged 62. He was buried at Hampton Lovett near Droitwich, close to his country home of Westwood Park.

Family
Partington was twice married. His first wedding took place at St Margaret's, Westminster on 6 August 1902, when he wed Honourable Clara Isabel Murray (1880–1945), daughter of Lord Elibank. The couple had one son and one daughter but were divorced in 1934. In 1934 he married an American widow, Leslie Tailer née Cornell, daughter of George B Cornell, of New York.

Children:
Edward Alexander Partington (1904–1949), who succeeded as Baron Doverdale
Honourable Aline Emily Partington (b. 1907), married 1936 Sir Kenneth Weir Hogg, 6th Baronet

References

External links 
 

1872 births
1935 deaths
Liberal Party (UK) MPs for English constituencies
Members of the Parliament of the United Kingdom for constituencies in Derbyshire
UK MPs 1900–1906
UK MPs 1906–1910
UK MPs 1910
UK MPs 1910–1918
Doverdale, 2
People educated at Rossall School
Progressive Party (London) politicians
Members of London County Council
People from Bury, Greater Manchester
High Peak, Derbyshire